Pleckstrin homology-like domain family A member 1 (PHLDA1) is a protein that in humans is encoded by the PHLDA1 gene.

This gene encodes an evolutionarily conserved proline-histidine rich nuclear protein. The encoded protein may play an important role in the anti-apoptotic effects of insulin-like growth factor-1.

Interactions
PHLDA1 has been shown to interact with RPL14, EIF3D and PABPC4.

References

Further reading